William Rollo may refer to:
 William Rollo (academic) (1892–1960), South African linguist and classicist
 Sir William Rollo (died 1645), Scottish royalist soldier
 Bill Rollo (born 1955), British Army officer